MerwedeLingelijn is the name of the train service in the Netherlands between Geldermalsen and Dordrecht, on the western part of the Elst–Dordrecht railway.  Train services were operated by Arriva until 8 Dec 2018, when Qbuzz took over.

Since 5 September 2011 (original schedule was 2009) there is a quarter-hourly train service between Dordrecht and Gorinchem. In order for this, the line between Dordrecht and Dordrecht Stadspolders was double tracked, and there is also a passing track built at Boven Hardinxveld, so that trains can pass each other.
Qbuzz uses seven train sets, the electric version of the Spurt, the same trains Arriva uses since late 2006 in Groningen and Friesland. These trains have been deployed since 14 September 2008, and have replaced the old Mat '64 trains. In 2011, three additional Spurt-trains were delivered to allow for the increased frequency. In 2019, these trains will be re-branded with the R-net color scheme and branding.

Stations 

From east to west, the following stations make part of the MerwedeLingelijn:
 Geldermalsen
 Beesd
 Leerdam
 Arkel
 Gorinchem
 Boven Hardinxveld
 Hardinxveld-Giessendam
 Hardinxveld Blauwe Zoom
 Sliedrecht
 Sliedrecht Baanhoek
 Dordrecht Stadspolders
 Dordrecht

External links
Qbuzz website 
Dutch Public Transport journey planner 

Passenger rail transport in the Netherlands
Railway lines in Gelderland
Railway lines in South Holland
Railway lines in Utrecht (province)
Transport in Dordrecht
Alblasserwaard
Gorinchem
Hardinxveld-Giessendam
Sliedrecht
Vijfheerenlanden
West Betuwe